Deputy Director is a job title used in many organizations around the world for a deputy for a director, and may refer to:

 Deputy Director, a general rank below director within His Majesty's Civil Service; see Grading schemes
 Deputy Director of the Central Intelligence Agency
 Deputy Director of the National Security Agency
 Deputy Director of the Federal Bureau of Investigation
 Assistant Deputy Director of National Intelligence for Open Source

See also
Deputy Director-General (disambiguation)
Director General
Director (disambiguation)